Adi Joana Rokomatu is a Fijian chief who holds the title of Tui Sigatoka, or Paramount Chief of Sigatoka.

Adi Rokomatu has worked closely with the Sigatoka Town Council to promote development projects, as well as efforts to beautify the town. She also hosts the Nadroga rugby team, providing them with meals. She arranges church services for the rugby team on Friday nights whenever they are in town.

References

Fijian chiefs
People from Sigatoka
Living people
Year of birth missing (living people)